Grevillea halmaturina is a species of flowering plant in the family Proteaceae and is endemic to South Australia. It is a prickly, spreading to erect shrub with sharply-pointed, linear to more or less-cylindrical leaves and large groups of white to pale pink flowers.

Description

Taxonomy
Grevillea hakeoides was first formally described in 1890 by Ralph Tate in his book A Handbook of the Flora of Extratropical South Australia. The specific epithet (halmaturina) is derived from Halmaturus, a name once applied to a genus of kangaroos, and commonly used for species from Kangaroo Island.

In 2000, Robert Owen Makinson described two subspecies of G. halmaturina in the Flora of Australia and the names are accepted by the Australian Plant Census:
 Grevillea halmaturina Tate subsp. halmaturina has leaves with conspicuous longitudinal ridges;
 Grevillea halmaturina subsp. laevis Makinson has smooth leaves, lacking the ridges of the autonym.

Distribution and habitat
Both subspecies mostly grow in shrubby woodland, often in moister places. Subspecies halmaturina is endemic to Kangaroo Island and subspecies laevis is endemic to the southern part of the Eyre Peninsula.

References

halmaturina
Proteales of Australia
Endemic flora of Australia
Flora of South Australia
Plants described in 1890
Taxa named by Ralph Tate